Reactive ethnicity is the phenomenon where actions intended to limit or ban a practice cause people to continue the practice in protest. Jeffery Reitz has used this term to explain why the French restrictions on traditional Islamic veils are provoking even unveiled Muslim women to wear Islamic veils.

See also
Backfire effect
Civil disobedience
Identity politics

References

External links
 Reactive Ethnicity and Anticipated Discrimination among American Muslims in Southeastern Michigan
 "Reactive Ethnicity" or "Assimilation"?

Further reading 

Portes, Alejandro, and Bryan Lagae. "Immigration, social change, and reactive ethnicity in the second generation." US Latinization: Education and the New Latino South (2017): 251–271. .

Sociological terminology
Ethnicity